Gerard Diver (born 1 January 1965) is an Irish Social Democratic and Labour Party (SDLP) politician who served as a Member of the Legislative Assembly (MLA) for  Foyle between January and March 2016.

Diver was first elected to Derry City Council in 2001, representing the DEA of Waterside in Derry. From 2008 to 2009, Diver served as Mayor of Derry. In 2014, after the boundary changes, Diver was re-elected onto the newly formed Derry City and Strabane District Council. In 2015, veteran SDLP MLA Pat Ramsey announced his retirement from the Northern Ireland Assembly; Diver was selected as his replacement and co-opted onto Ramsey's seat in early 2016.

References

1965 births
Living people
Northern Ireland MLAs 2011–2016
Social Democratic and Labour Party MLAs
Mayors of Derry